
Lac de Mauvoisin is a reservoir in the canton of Valais, Switzerland. The dam is the 11th highest in the world, and the 6th highest arch dam.

The reservoir lies in the upper Val de Bagnes, between the massif of the Grand Combin, one of the highest mountains of the Alps, and La Ruinette. The highest peak visible from the lake is the Combin de la Tsessette.

Gallery

See also
List of lakes of Switzerland
List of mountain lakes of Switzerland

External links

Swiss Dams: Profile of Mauvoisin

Mauvoisin
Mauvoisin
Bagnes